Xiao Xiu, formally Prince Kang of Ancheng ( (475–518),
was a younger half-brother of Xiao Yan (Emperor Wu), the founder of the Liang dynasty of China. According to the Book of Liang, he was the 7th son of Xiao Yan's father Xiao Shunzhi.

Xiao Xiu is said to have been a disciple of the Buddhist monk  Daodu (道度, 462–527).

Xiao Xiu's Mausoleum

Xiao Xiu is better remembered not for what he did while alive, but for his tomb, whose assortment of animal sculptures is the most complete set of such statuary surviving from that period.

Xiao Xiu's tomb is located in the Ganjia Lane neighborhood in today's Qixia District north-east of Nanjing.
It is thought that the sculptural  ensemble of the tomb included a pair of winged lion-like animals (bixie), four steles supported by stone tortoises, and a pair of fluted columns. Visited and photographed by Victor Segalen in 1917, the ensemble of the Tomb of Xiao Xiu (with his name better known under its French transcription, Siao Sieou) soon became well known to Europe's and the world's students of ancient Chinese sculpture. Presently, the site is on the grounds of Gan Jia Xiang Elementary School.

Notes

External links
 梁安成康王萧秀墓石刻  (Sculptures at the Tomb of Xiao Xiu)  (Xiao Xiu's brief biography; description and modern photos of his tomb statuary ensemble)

Liang dynasty Buddhists
Liang dynasty imperial princes
475 births
518 deaths